The term Maurists may refer to:

Congregation of Saint Maur, a congregation of French Benedictines
Maurist Party, a faction of the Spanish Liberal Conservative Party